Colombia held elections to both chambers of Congress on . The nationwide constituency for the 102-member Senate was contested by 16 lists, comprising 948 candidates. There are 33 regional constituencies for the Chamber of Representatives, plus a few other ethnic minority constituencies. In all, 282 lists, with 1,533 candidates, contested the 165 seats in the Chamber. Almost 30 million people were registered to vote.

Results

Senate
Incumbent President Álvaro Uribe maintained an absolute majority of seats in the Senate. The two major parties supporting Uribe – the Party of the U and the Conservative Party –, got 27 and 23 seats, respectively. The Party of the U achieved 25.17% of the votes, gaining eight seats, followed by the Conservative Party, with 20,6%, which gained four seats. The Liberals, which consists the main opposition party in the Senate, achieved 15.8% of the votes and kept its 18 seats.

The Liberal Party was followed by the National Integration Party, also allied to Uribe, was an electoral surprise, achieving 8.13% of the votes and eight seats. It became the fourth political force in the country, surpassing the Radical Change, also in the Uribe coalition, which achieved 7.97% of the votes and also eight seats, losing seven. The Alternative Democratic Pole, a more radical opposition party, lost two seats, achieving 7.62% of the votes and eight seats. The Green Party achieved five seats with 4.75% of the votes, followed by the Independent Absolute Renovation Movement with one seat and 2.7% of the votes. The Citizens Commitment for Colombia achieved 1.6% of the votes and gained no seats.

Elected Senators

Chamber

References

Parliamentary elections in Colombia
Colombia
Election and referendum articles with incomplete results